Korea national ice hockey team may refer to:

North Korea
 North Korea men's national ice hockey team
 North Korea women's national ice hockey team

South Korea
 South Korea men's national ice hockey team
 South Korea women's national ice hockey team

Unified Korea
 Unified Korea women's ice hockey team